The Dirección General de Radio, Televisión y Cinematografía (General Directorate of Radio, Television and Film), known by its acronym RTC, is an agency of the Mexican Secretariat of the Interior (SEGOB). It rates films and television programs broadcast in the country, and it also manages the time allotted to the government on broadcast television and radio stations, including the production and distribution of La Hora Nacional, a weekly program heard on all radio stations in Mexico.

Its current director is Rodolfo González Fernández.

History
The RTC was created on July 6, 1977, by a decree published in the Diario Oficial de la Federación. Its first director was Margarita López Portillo. When it was created, it took over various tasks, including the operations of the national radio station Radio México, rural television services and other radio and television stations owned by the federal government and the management of the National Film Archive. It also proceeded to liquidate the nearly 40-year-old National Film Bank. In 1983, the broadcast stations under RTC's purview were transferred to new government institutes. In 1985, it received further power by issuing opinions on broadcast stations during their concession renewals (managed by the SCT), and in 1989, it took over production of La Hora Nacional, government commercials, and mandatory cadenas nacionales. At this time, it also began rating movies and television programs.

In 2006, the RTC closed its nine regional offices which had monitored broadcast stations throughout the country, in favor of monitoring stations from Mexico City only.

From 2014 to 2018, RTC was headed by Amador Díaz Moguel.

Functions
The RTC has several functions in the three media covered in its remit:

Government broadcasts and advertising
In radio, the RTC coordinates the broadcasting of government public service announcements and cadenas nacionales across the country's radio stations and makes new PSAs and content available over the internet. In most years, except during election campaigns when electoral authorities and parties take it over, the RTC controls 88 percent of the time allotted to the government, with the remaining 12 percent managed by the National Electoral Institute. Likewise, the RTC also distributes PSAs for air on television stations, as well as longer-form programs that must be at least five minutes in length.

Rating, standards and censorship
The RTC also has the power to regulate content and programming in broadcasting and film, as the manager of the country's film and television rating systems. It issues the required permits to broadcast religious programming and sanctions violators of its policies on language, standards of conduct and station contests. From 2013 to 2015, however, it rarely used this power, only issuing two fines, one to a Monterrey radio station for "corrupt language" and another to a Mérida broadcaster for improperly held contests.

The RTC's ratings scale includes AA , A , B , B-15 , C , and D classifications. On television, the rating of a program determines the time period when it may be broadcast: for instance, programs rated B-15 can only be aired after 9pm, those rated C can only be aired after 10pm, and D-rated programming can only be screened after midnight, notably including telenovelas that deal with drug trafficking or cartels. Other media (such as television programs and movies) may be rated by other entities. The RTC rating system is one of various motion picture rating systems that are used to help parents decide what films and TV are appropriate for their children.

The RTC has also been far more lax than it once was in issuing permits for religious programming; while it issued 7,536 such authorizations between 2000 and 2001, it issued 380,263 of them in 2013 and 2014, a more than 50-fold increase.

RTC film and television ratings

Ownership and operation of broadcast stations
In 1978, the government nationalized several radio stations that held outstanding debts, owned by Grupo Fórmula. As a result, the RTC-Radio Group was formed, with three stations: XEB, XERPM and XEMP, all in Mexico City. These stations would be transferred to the new Instituto Mexicano de la Radio in 1983.

The rural television service, known as Televisión Cultural de México and quickly changed to Televisión Rural de México and later Televisión de la República Méxicana (from 1980), also was transferred out of the RTC in 1983, to the newly formed Instituto Mexicano de la Televisión.

See also

 Motion picture content rating system
 Television content rating systems
 Motion Picture Association of America
 TV Parental Guidelines
Canadian motion picture rating system
 Régie du cinéma (Quebec)

References

External links
 

RTC
RTC
RTC
RTC
RTC
Mexico